The United States competed in the 2019 Pan American Games in Lima, Peru from July 26 to August 11, 2019. The team included 313 men and 327 women.

The United States traditionally fielded its B or C teams in the most of sports. In basketball, the US men's team was made up of U20 Big East collegiate players, who were blown out by a senior professional Argentine team in the semi-final, but still managed to win bronze against the Dominican Republic.

The United States 4x100 mixed medley relay swimming team originally won the gold medal, however it was disqualified for two alleged breaststroke kicks off the turn. USA Swimming voiced their disagreement with the decision, but they were not allowed to appeal.

The United States topped the medal count with 122 gold and 293 overall medals, its best result in the 21st century.

Medalists

The following U.S. competitors won medals at the games. In the by discipline sections below, medalists' names are bolded. 

|  style="text-align:left; width:78%; vertical-align:top;"|

|  style="text-align:left; width:26%; vertical-align:top;"|

* – Indicates that the athlete competed in preliminaries but not the final.

Competitors
The following is the list of number of competitors (per gender) participating at the games per sport/discipline.

Archery

The United States qualified a full team of eight archers through the 2018 Pan American Archery Championships.

Men

Women

Mixed

Artistic swimming

The United States qualified a team of nine athletes automatically, as being the only member as part of zone three.

Athletics

The United States has qualified 90 athletes for the games.

Men
Track & road events

Field events

Combined events – Decathlon

Women
Track & road events

Field events

Combined events – Heptathlon

Badminton

The United States qualified a full team of eight badminton athletes.

Basketball

5x5
Summary

Men's tournament

Preliminary round

Semifinal

Bronze medal game

Women's tournament

Preliminary round

Semifinal

Gold medal game

3x3
Summary

Men's tournament

Preliminary round

Semifinal

Gold medal game

Women's tournament

Preliminary round

Semifinal

Gold medal game

Basque pelota

Men

Beach volleyball

The United States qualified four beach volleyball athletes (two men and two women).

Bowling

The United States qualified two women by finishing in the top two at the 2018 PABCON Female Championship.

Boxing

The United States qualified 11 boxers (six men and five women).

Men

Women

Canoeing

Slalom
The United States qualified a total of four slalom athletes (two men and two women).

Sprint
The United States qualified a total of 13 sprint athletes (seven men and six women).

Men

Women

Qualification legend: QF – Qualify to final; SF – Qualify to semifinal

Cycling

The United States has qualified 20 cyclists across all disciplines.

Road

Track
Madison

Team pursuit

Omnium

BMX
Freestyle

Racing

Diving

The United States qualified a full team of eight divers (four men and four women).

Men

Women

Equestrian

The United States qualified a full team of 12 equestrians (four per discipline).

Dressage

Eventing

Jumping

Fencing

The United States qualified a full team of 18 fencers (nine men and nine women).

Men

Women

Field hockey

The United States qualified a men's and women's team (of 16 athletes each, for a total of 32) by being ranked among the top three unqualified nations from the 2017 Men's Pan American Cup and 2017 Women's Pan American Cup respectively.

Summary

Men's tournament

Roster

Preliminary round

Quarterfinal

Semifinal

Bronze medal match

Women's tournament

Roster

Preliminary round

Quarterfinal

Semifinal

Bronze medal match

Football

Men's tournament

United States qualified but declined to enter.

Women's tournament

United States qualified but declined to enter.

Golf

The United States qualified a full team of 4 golfers by virtue of their positions in the Official World Golf Rankings and Women's World Golf Rankings.

Gymnastics

The United States qualified a full team of 21 gymnasts (five men and five women in artistic gymnastics, two individual and a team of five women in rhythmic gymnastics, and two men and two women in trampoline gymnastics) through the 2018 Pan American Gymnastics Championships.

Artistic
Men
Team final and individual qualification

Individual finals

Women
Team final and individual qualification

Individual finals

Rhythmic
Individual

Group

Trampoline

Handball

The United States qualified men's and women's teams by defeating Canada in a home and away series in September 2018.

Summary

Men's tournament

5th–8th place classification

5th place match

Women's tournament

Preliminary round

Semifinal

Bronze medal match

Judo

The United States qualified 13 judokas (six men and seven women).

Men

Women

Karate

The United States qualified a team of nine karatekas (four men and five women).

Kumite (sparring)

Kata (forms)

Modern pentathlon

The United States qualified five modern pentathletes (two men and three women).

Racquetball

The United States qualified five racquetball athletes (three men and two women).

Roller sports

Artistic

Speed

Rowing

The United States qualified 11 boats, for a total of 20 rowers, at the 2018 Pan American Qualification Regatta.

Men

Women

Qualification legend: FA – Qualify to medal final; FB – Qualify to non-medal final; SA/B – Qualify to semifinal; R – Qualify to repechage

Rugby sevens

The United States men's and women's teams are automatically qualified to the Pan American Games.

Summary

Men's tournament

Pool stage

Semifinal

Bronze medal match

Women's tournament

Pool stage

Semifinal

Gold medal match

Sailing

The United States has qualified 11 boats for a total of 17 sailors.

Men

Women

Mixed

Open

Shooting

The United States qualified 22 athletes through the 2018 Shooting Championships of the Americas.

Men

Women

Mixed

Softball

The United States qualified a women's team (of 15 athletes) by winning the 2017 Women's Pan American Championships. The men's team (also consisting of 15 athletes) qualified later by also finishing in the top five nations at the 2017 Men's Pan American Championships.

Summary

Men's tournament

Preliminary round

Semifinals

Final

Grand final

Women's tournament

Preliminary round

Semifinals

Final

Grand final

Squash

The United States qualified a full team of 6 athletes through the 2018 Pan American Squash Championships.

Men

Women

Mixed

Surfing

The United States qualified six surfers (four men and two women) in the sport's debut at the Pan American Games.

Artistic

Race

Swimming

The United States qualified a full team of 36 swimmers in the pool events and a further four swimmers for the open water events.

Men

Women

Mixed

Qualification legend: Q – Qualify to the medal final; q – Qualify to the non-medal final

* – Indicates that the athlete swam in the heat but not the final

Table tennis

The United States qualified a full team of 6 athletes through the 2018 Pan American Table Tennis Championships.

Men

Women

Mixed

Taekwondo

Kyorugi (sparring)
Men

Women

Poomsae (forms)

Tennis

Men

Women

Mixed

Triathlon

The United States qualified a full team of six triathletes, four through the 2018 Pan American Mixed Relay Championships and two further through the International Triathlon Union World Rankings.

Individual

Mixed relay

Volleyball

The United States women's team qualified for the Pan American Games through the 2018 Women's Pan-American Volleyball Cup. The United States men's team qualified through the 2019 Men's Pan-American Volleyball Cup.

Summary

Men's tournament 

Group stage

5th place match

Women's tournament 

Group stage

7th place match

Water polo

The United States men's and women's water polo teams are automatically qualified for the Pan American Games.

Summary

Men's tournament

Preliminary round

Quarterfinal

Semifinal

Gold medal match

Women's tournament

Water skiing

The United States qualified four water skiers (two of each gender) and two wakeboarders (one of each gender).

Water skiing
Men

Women

Wakeboarding

Weightlifting

The United States qualified ten weightlifters (four man and six women).

Men

Women

Wrestling

Men

Women

See also
United States at the 2019 Parapan American Games
United States at the 2020 Summer Olympics

References

Nations at the 2019 Pan American Games
2019
2019 in American sports